The gymnastics competition in the 1995 Summer Universiade were held in Fukuoka, Japan.

Artistic gymnastics

Men's events

Women's events

Rhythmic gymnastics

External sources
 Gymnastics results of the 1995 Summer Universiade
 Results on sports123.com

Summer Universiade
1995 Summer Universiade
1995